Yendovsky is a rural locality (a khutor) in Sulyayevskoye Rural Settlement, Kumylzhensky District, Volgograd Oblast, Russia. The population was 106 as of 2010.

Geography 
Yendovsky is located on Khopyorsko-Buzulukskaya Plain, on the bank of the Khopyor River, 40 km northwest of Kumylzhenskaya (the district's administrative centre) by road. Pokruchinsky is the nearest rural locality.

References 

Rural localities in Kumylzhensky District